Lightweight is a weight class in combat sports and rowing.

Lightweight may also refer to:

Light in weight
Lightweight (company), a Japanese video game developer
Lightweight (film), a 2004 French film
Lightweight (MMA), a mixed martial arts division
 "Lightweight", a song by Demi Lovato from Unbroken
Land Rover 1/2 ton Lightweight, a British military vehicle

Computing
Light-weight process
Light Weight Kernel Threads
Lightweight software
Lightweight markup language

See also

 
 Lightweighting, a concept in the auto industry
 Heavyweight (disambiguation)